Cyclophora carsoni is a moth in the family Geometridae. It is found on Borneo. The habitat consists of montane forests at altitudes between 1,200 and 2,600 meters.

The length of the forewings is 13–15 mm. The markings are similar to those of Cyclophora dimerites, but there is much greater variability. There are forms which are shaded darker red in the medial zones of both wings or just along the medial.

References

Moths described in 1997
Cyclophora (moth)
Moths of Borneo